Interstate 255 (I-255) is a bypass route of I-55 in Greater St. Louis. Along with I-270, it forms a loop around the central portion of the bi-state metro area; a majority of I-255 is located on the Illinois half. It shares its southern terminus with I-270 at the junction with I-55; I-270 and I-255 go to the west and east, respectively. U.S. Route 50 (US 50) joins I-255 at Lemay Ferry Road. It crosses the Mississippi River on the Jefferson Barracks Bridge, enters Illinois, and then turns northeast. There is a junction with I-64, where US 50 breaks off and goes east, and then further north there is a junction with I-55 again, I-70, and US 40, all of which are all cosigned together. The next junction is another one with I-270, which is the northern terminus of I-255. After that, the limited-access freeway continues on as Illinois Route 255 (IL 255).

Route description

I-255's counterclockwise terminus is at an interchange with I-55 and I-270 in Mehlville, Missouri. The beltway is designated as I-270 (with Kansas City as the control city) west of this interchange and as I-255 east (with Chicago as the control city) east of this interchange. The section of I-255 east from this interchange to the Jefferson Barracks Bridge was first built in the 1960s to carry US 50 traffic across the Mississippi River. The roadway was upgraded between 2002 and 2004. Repairs included both new pavement and the replacement of the Telegraph Road bridge.

Once it crosses the Mississippi River and enters Illinois, I-255 is signed as a north–south highway. It is considerably newer than the Missouri section; it was constructed in the 1980s. At the IL 3 interchange, I-255 turns sharply to the north. It briefly overlaps with IL 3 in Dupo. After Dupo, I-255 turns northeast, skirting Cahokia and East St. Louis. An interchange at Mousette Lane in Sauget was constructed in the 1990s and provides motorist access to GCS Ballpark (home to the Gateway Grizzlies baseball team) and the St. Louis Downtown Airport. Given its proximity to the airport, this section of I-255 features shorter light poles to better accommodate takeoffs and landings.

North of Sauget, I-255 traverses a portion of the Frank Holten State Recreation Area before an interchange with I-64 west of Caseyville. This section of freeway opened in 1986. Traffic can enter and exit I-255 at an interchange with Collinsville Road (formerly US 40) just east of the Fairmont Park Racetrack.

I-255 meets I-55/I-70 at an interchange in Collinsville, its original intended terminus. North of this interchange, the control city for I-255 changes from "Chicago" to "To I-270". The decision to not extend the I-255 designation to the new freeway reflects the fact that state and not federal funds were used to pay for construction.

History

I-255 route was proposed from I-55/I-244 near Green Park to I-55/70 west of Cahokia Mounds near the intersection with IL 111 when plans surfaced in the 1950s Yellow Book. It was originally designed to be a four lane highway but was changed to six lanes.

Since that routing was to go through the American Bottoms, archaeological investigations had to be conducted prior to any construction, which would later become known as the FAI 270 Series. When Cahokia Mounds was designated in the federal register, an alternative alignment for I-255 from I-64 to I-55/70 was selected. This delayed construction of I-255 until the late 1970s, making it the last Interstate Highway in metropolitan St. Louis to be built.

Both the western (I-270) and eastern (I-255) portions of the Interstate loop around St. Louis were originally designated as I-270. However, the route that Illinois selected ("Corridor 413") included an interchange in Pontoon Beach between the new beltway (running north and south parallel to the Mississippi River) and the existing beltway (running east and west to a terminus at I-55/I-70). As such, two intersecting Interstate Highways would have carried the same route number. As such, the Illinois Department of Transportation (IDOT) concluded a different route number would be necessary for the eastern leg of the beltway. While I-870 was initially considered, informal use of I-255 in contemporary local media coverage led to its widespread adoption. By 1980, IDOT announced that the eastern portion of the St. Louis beltway was to be designated as I-255.

Exit list

References

External links

55-2
2
55-2
55-2
Roads in Greater St. Louis
Transportation in Madison County, Illinois
Transportation in Monroe County, Illinois
Transportation in St. Clair County, Illinois
Transportation in St. Louis County, Missouri